Vaghri (Bavri) is an Indic language of Pakistan. Vaghri, Wagdi, and Bauria are variants of the same name. It's not clear how many languages they are.

References

Languages of Sindh
Western Indo-Aryan languages